Yaroo khosa is a village located at 13 km away from Dera Ghazi khan in province of Punjab, Pakistan. The mountains are 20 km away. The people speak Balochi and Sraiki in this village.

References

Populated places in Dera Ghazi Khan District
Union councils of Dera Ghazi Khan District
Cities and towns in Punjab, Pakistan